Tarazuj (also Romanized as Ţarāzūj, Tarazooj, Ţarāzowj, and Ţarāzzūj; also known as Marāzūj, Tazarvadzh, Tazarvaj, and Tāzarwaj) is a village in Bonab Rural District, in the Central District of Zanjan County, Zanjan Province, Iran. At the 2006 census, its population was 140, in 25 families.

References 

Populated places in Zanjan County